The Almanor Railroad   was a Class III short-line railroad operating in Northern California, USA.  It was owned by Collins Pine Company, a division of The Collins Companies and annually hauled approximately 300 carloads of timber and lumber products generated at the mill.  The railroad was named after Lake Almanor, which the railroad ran over (by causeway) and adjacent to.

The  railroad ran west from a connection with the BNSF Railway (former Western Pacific) at Clear Creek Junction to Chester, California.

The Almanor Railroad was incorporated on September 15, 1941, and purchased the line from the Grande Ronde Lumber Company; and was discontinued in late 2009.

The portion of the Red River Lumber line between Westwood and Chester was the BNSF mainline from Keddie to Bieber. The BNSF also has trackage rights over the Almanor Railroad.

The Almanor Railroad had one 70-ton GE locomotive built in 1955.

References

Further reading

External links

The Collins Companies: Almanor: History

Defunct California railroads
Logging railroads in the United States
1941 establishments in California
2009 disestablishments in California